Tomáš Košický (born 11 March 1986) is a Slovak goalkeeper who plays for Czech club Vítkovice.

Club career

Inter Bratislava
Košický began his professional career with hometown club Inter Bratislava, where he advanced from the youth system into the senior squad. He made 12 appearances for the club before being sold to Sicilian giants, Calcio Catania in the Italian Serie A.

Calcio Catania
In the summer of 2008, Košický officially signed for Calcio Catania as a reserve goalkeeper. In his first season with the Sicilian club, Košický was the third choice goalkeeper, behind Albano Bizzarri and Ciro Polito. During the January 2009 transfer window, however, Košický became the club's second choice as Catania opted to loan Ciro Polito to US Grosseto FC. In return, Paolo Acerbis was brought in from Grosseto, also on loan.

In April 2009 it was confirmed that first choice goalkeeper, Albano Bizzarri would not be renewing his contract with Catania, and thus head coach Walter Zenga opted to use Košický as the starting keeper in order for the young Slovak to gain experience. Košický even served as captain for Catania in the 16 May 2009 Serie A fixture versus AS Roma. Košický began the new season as a reserve goalkeeper again, following the transfer of Argentine International, Mariano Andújar, as well as veteran Andrea Campagnolo. Košický made his 2010 Serie A debut in a March 2010 match away to Chievo Verona, the game ended 1–1. That match proved to be his only appearance of the 2009-10 season, and the Slovakian failed to make an appearance during the 2010-11 Serie A season.

During the 2011-12 Serie A season, Košický again remained third choice, behind Andújar and Campagnolo for the third season in the running, however, following a mid-season fallout with the club, Andújar was released on loan to former club Estudiantes, and following his departure, Košický had appeared in three Serie A fixtures following an injury to Campagnolo in late January. However, after eventually losing his place to loan-signing Juan Pablo Carrizo, the player failed to feature again, and eventually transferred to the recently relegated Novara Calcio, as part of the deal that saw Takayuki Morimoto return to Catania.

Novara Calcio
On 22 June 2012 Košický officially transferred to Serie B side Novara Calcio.

Asteras Tripolis
On 22 July 2014 Košický officially transferred to Superleague Greece side Asteras Tripolis.

Vítkovice
In early 2023, Košický joined Vítkovice in the third-tier Czech Moravian-Silesian Football League.

References

External links
 Profile on Football-Lineups.com
 
 http://www.imscouting.com/players/tomas-kosicky/

1986 births
Footballers from Bratislava
Living people
Slovak footballers
Slovakia international footballers
Association football goalkeepers
FK Inter Bratislava players
Catania S.S.D. players
Novara F.C. players
Asteras Tripolis F.C. players
Hapoel Ra'anana A.F.C. players
Debreceni VSC players
MFK Vítkovice players
Slovak Super Liga players
Serie A players
Serie B players
Super League Greece players
Israeli Premier League players
Nemzeti Bajnokság I players
Nemzeti Bajnokság II players
Moravian-Silesian Football League players
Slovak expatriate footballers
Expatriate footballers in Italy
Slovak expatriate sportspeople in Italy
Expatriate footballers in Greece
Slovak expatriate sportspeople in Greece
Expatriate footballers in Israel
Slovak expatriate sportspeople in Israel
Expatriate footballers in Hungary
Slovak expatriate sportspeople in Hungary
Expatriate footballers in the Czech Republic
Slovak expatriate sportspeople in the Czech Republic